The following is a list of Indiana Hoosiers men's basketball head coaches. The Hoosiers have had 30 coaches in their 120-season history.

Coaching history

References

Indiana

Indiana Hoosiers basketball coaches